James Dale (fl. 1589) was an English politician.

He was a Member (MP) of the Parliament of England for Richmond, North Yorkshire in 1589. No further information on him is known to be recorded.

References

Year of birth unknown
Year of death unknown
English MPs 1589
Place of birth unknown
Place of death unknown